Chonlathorn "Captain" Kongyingyong (born 2 February 1998) is a Thai actor, best known for his debut lead role in Love Sick The Series, a TV adaptation of a popular yaoi novel.  He graduated from Mahidol University International Demonstration School and studied Social Communication Innovation at Srinakharinwirot University. He acted in school dramas U-Prince Series, Love Songs Love Series and the Secret Seven TV series after his successful run in Lovesick the series.  In 2018, he played Earn in the In Family We Trust drama. In 2019, he joined fellow members of Nine by Nine in the school drama Great Men Academy.  Captain also returned to his role as Noh from Love Sick The Series in the short 3-part miniseries, Reminders.

As a singer, Captain has sung songs in the Love Sick The Series soundtrack, the U-Prince the Series Soundtrack and the Water Boyy the film Soundtrack.  In 2018, Captain joined Thai Boy Group NINE BY NINE ( 9by9 or 9x9 ).  Nine by Nine had their debut in November 2018 for their mini-album En-Route.  Captain and the members of Nine by Nine then embarked on a nationwide tour to promote the band's album that concluded with a Finale Concert in March 2019.  As a member of NINE BY NINE, Captain has sung 'Night Light', 'Hypnotize', 'Shouldn't', 'The Lucky One' (Great Men Academy OST), and 'Eternity'.

Acting 
Beginning: Love Sick the Series.

Captain's first role was in Love Sick The Series.  He portrays Noh, one of the main characters, in the popular boy's love series.  Like most of the actors in the show, he was discovered in an open-casting call.  The first season of Love Sick had a total of 12 Episodes.  Its popularity prompted a Second Season with 36 episodes.  Captain's role as Noh endeared him to many and won him awards, such as the Kazz Awards 2015's Most Popular Shipped Couple of the Year (Captain and White (co-star)), and also, Kazz Awards 2016's Most Popular Couple (White/Captain).

Captain also sang a song for the Love Sick the Series Soundtrack named Begging [ขอร้อง].

U-Prince the Series Era

In 2016, Captain took on the role of Kiryu in the popular school drama, U-PRINCE the series.  He first appears in a supporting role in two of the U-PRINCE Series parts, culminating in Kiryu's 4-episode part.   In U-PRINCE the series: The Extroverted Humanist, Captain plays Kiryu Weller, an outgoing second-year student from the Faculty of Humanities. He becomes interested in Pinyin, his junior who transferred from China.  Pinyin has an introverted personality – she's anxious, doesn't make friends easily and is very shy. When they first meet, Pinyin finds Kiryu's extroverted nature too hard to deal with, but then they start liking each other.  U-PRINCE the series: The Extroverted Humanist had four episodes.  It aired on February 12, 2017 - March 5, 2017 on the GMM 25 Network.

Love Songs Love Series and Secret Seven Era

1n 2016, Captain joined the cast of Love Songs Love Series: Summer (2016), also known as, Love Songs Love Series ตอน ฤดูร้อน.  He played a supporting role as Pat.  The series had six episodes that ran on GMM 25 Network, from May 4, 2016 to May 19, 2016. In 2017, Captain was then cast in the main role of Love Songs Love Series: Small Boats Should Leave (2017). He plays the role of Tun in four episodes that aired from May 7, 2017 - May 28, 2017 on the GMM 25 Network.

On August 19, 2017, Captain took on the role of Neo, in Secret Seven: Thoe Khon Ngao Kap Khao Thang Chet (from Thai: เธอคนเหงากับเขาทั้งเจ็ด).  A 12-episode school romantic drama about Padlom (Sutatta Udomsilp), a lonely girl who's afraid of love. One day, she finds out that one of seven young men secretly likes her. Captain plays the role of Neo, who is number seven on the list.

NINE by NINE and In Family We Trust

In 2018, Captain became one of the members of Thai Boy Group NINE BY NINE under 4Nologue.  He was then cast in the role of Earn in 4Nologue's drama project In Family We Trust. Ern is Phatson's second son, who helps manage the Pattaya hotel's theater.  Captain and the members of NINE by NINE played the roles of the grandsons in the drama.

Great Men Academy & ReminderS

In February to March 2019, Captain joined members of NINE BY NINE in the LINE TV show Great Men Academy, also known as Great Men Academy สุภาพบุรุษสุดที่เลิฟ, a LINE TV Originals production.  He played the role of Sean.

In April 2019, Captain appeared in the short drama, Reminders, reprising his role as Noh from Love Sick The Series.  Reminders is a three-part omnibus directed by New Siwaj Sawatmaneekul, with the final episode airing at the Millennial's Choice 2019 Fan meeting ReminderS.

Eat with Captain & the Human Error Project
August 2019 saw Captain appear in a Reality Series created by Nadao Bangkok called Eat with Captain.  The Eat with Captain series was made available on Nadao Bankgok's YouTube Channel.  Captain visits restaurants in Thailand, showcasing different types of delicacies, coffee and drinks.

Captain then appeared in the Human Error Project in November 2019.  The Human Error Project is the production of three films and three songs by three artists.  Captain plays a supporting role in two of the films in the project, and the main role in his own short film, White Captain.

In 2021, Captain appeared in Blackout, a Thai thriller/drama series running on AIS Play. Blackout is about a group of friends who wake up with no memory after a blackout. They must find out what happened to them the night before in order to find their way out of a secret bar. Captain plays the role of A.

Singing 
Captain sang 'Begging [ขอร้อง]' in the Love Sick The Series soundtrack, and 'Tah Tur Mai Roo (OST. U-PRINCE Series)' for the U-PRINCE series soundtrack.  He also sang, "My World Has Only You [โลกฉันมีแค่เธอ]" for the Water Boyy Thai LGBT film Soundtrack.

Captain joined Thai Boy Group NINE BY NINE (ไนน์บายนาย), also stylized as 9by9 and 9×9. The Thai Boy Group debuted on November 9, 2018.  In February 2019, Captain toured as one of the NINE by NINE members in a tour dubbed: 9 x 9 THAILAND TOUR: ROUTE TO THE DESTINATION.   The group performed in various provinces in Thailand for their fans.   NINE by NINE was a pilot crossover project in cooperation with  Nadao Bangkok and GMM Grammy’s MBO. 4Nologue’s chief executive Anuwat “Wutt” Wichiennarat recruited nine boys – Thanapob “Tor” Leeratanakajorn, Teeradon “James” Supapunpinyo, Chonlathorn “Captain” Kongyingyong, Lapat “Third” Ngamchaweng, Sivakorn “Porche” Adulsuttikul, Jakrin “Jackie” Kungwankiertichai, Kritsanapoom “JJ" Pibulsonggram, Paris "Ice" Inthonkomansut, and Vachirawich "Ryu" Aranthanawong, for his group, Nine by Nine, or 9x9.  NINE BY NINE then had their last concert dubbed: 9x9 THE FINAL CONCERT: EN [D] ROUTE on March 9, 2019, and disbanded with one final song called “Eternity”.  In May 2019, NINE by NINE then won the KAZZ  Magazine 2019 Award for Rising Stars.

In November 2019, Captain was part of the HUMAN ERROR project.  The HUMAN ERROR project is a compilation of three short movies and three songs by three artists, that is Jaylerr, Captain and Paris.  The titles of the short films are BLUE for Jayler, WHITE for Captain and RED for Paris. Captain appears as supporting actor in the two of the films, and as lead in his own short film titled, 'White Captain'.  Captain's song in the project is titled 'Color Blind'.

The Color Blind music video directed by Songyos Sugmakanan dropped on November 28, 2019, on Line TV Original Album.

Personal life 
Captain graduated from Mahidol University International Demonstration School and enrolled in the Faculty of Social Communication Innovation at Srinakharinwirot University.  He has a passion for photography, saying he loves taking candid photos of people on the street most.  Captain's photography hobby gave him a chance to try out a photo shoot with ElleThailand.  He also has a deep love for art. His hobbies also include listening to music.

Filmography

Discography

Commercials
 AIS Calling Melody
 Oishi
 SnackJack
 YAMAHA QBIX
 Samsung Thailand

Awards

 Kazz Awards 2015 - White & Captain won the most popular shipped couple of the year
 Kazz Awards 2016 - Most Popular Couple for White/Captain
 Kazz Awards 2016 - Most Popular Teen actor
 Kazz Awards 2017 - Most Popular Teen actor
 Kazz Awards 2017 - Youth of The Year

References

External links 

 Captain Chonlathorn Kongyingyong - ccaptainch
 
 CisT - captain2541

1998 births
Living people
Chonlathorn Kongyingyong
Chonlathorn Kongyingyong
Chonlathorn Kongyingyong